Anantha P. Chandrakasan is the dean of the School of Engineering and Vannevar Bush Professor of Electrical Engineering and Computer Science at Massachusetts Institute of Technology. He is chair of the MIT Climate and Sustainability Consortium and MIT AI Hardware Program, and co-chair the MIT–IBM Watson AI Lab, the MIT–Takeda Program, and the MIT and Accenture Convergence Initiative for Industry and Technology.

Biography 
Born in Chennai, India, Chandrakasan moved to the United States during high school. His mother, a biochemist, was a Fulbright Scholar. He received a Bachelor of Science in 1989, a Master of Science in 1990, and a Ph.D. in Electrical Engineering and Computer Sciences in 1994 from the University of California, Berkeley.

Career 
In 1994, Chandrakasan joined the Department of Electrical Engineering and Computer Science (EECS) at MIT. He was the Director of the MIT Microsystems Technology Laboratories from 2006 to 2011, and head of the EECS department from 2011 to 2017. In his role as head of EECS, he launched programs such as a year-long independent research program called “SuperUROP” that supported students doing publication-quality research; an annual event the Rising Stars program that brought together graduate and postdoc women to share advice for advancing academic careers; and an independent activities period (IAP) class called StartMIT that introduces students to entrepreneurship and connects students and postdocs with industrial innovation leaders.

In 2017, he was appointed dean of MIT's School of Engineering. His research focuses on the energy efficiency of electronic circuits. Early on in his research career, he worked on low-power chips for portable computers, which helped lead to the development of technology in small, energy-constrained devices like smartphones. His paper titled “Low-power CMOS digital design” published in the IEEE Journal of Solid-State Circuits (April 1992) is recognized as one of the most cited papers in the journal.

In 2016, Chandrakasan lead The Engine Working Groups to guide the development of Institute policies and procedures for engaging with The Engine. The Engine, a new external innovation accelerator, was launched by MIT to help start-ups pursuing capital- and time-intensive technologies access patient capital, workspaces, equipment, and services needed to bring solutions from inception to the marketplace. Sixty-two members of the MIT community, including faculty, students, postdocs, and staff, participated in this effort. 

Chandrakasan leads the MIT Energy-Efficient Circuits and Systems Group, which works on a variety of projects such as ultra-low power biomedical devices, energy-efficient processors, wireless authentication tags. The group also works on projects that involving circuit design, wireless charging, security hardware, and energy harvesting in Internet of Things devices.

As the Dean of Engineering, Chandrakasan has led or contributed to the creation of a number of initiatives including The Abdul Latif Jameel Clinic for Machine Learning in Health (Jameel Clinic), the MIT-IBM AI Watson Lab, The MIT Quest for Intelligence, the MIT-Sensetime Alliance, the MIT Stephen A. Schwarzman College of Computing, the MIT-Takeda Program, and the MIT and Accenture Convergence Initiative for Industry and Technology.

He is a co-author of Low Power Digital CMOS Design (Kluwer Academic Publishers, 1995), Digital Integrated Circuits (Pearson Prentice-Hall, 2003, 2nd edition), and Sub-threshold Design for Ultra-Low Power Systems (Springer 2006).

Chandrakasan was elected a member of the National Academy of Engineering (2015) for the development of low-power circuit and system design methods.

Professional service 
Chandrakasan has been involved with the IEEE International Solid-state Circuits for a quarter-century since 1996 including the following leadership roles:

 Chair, ISSCC Signal Processing Subcommittee, 1999–2001
 Vice Chair, ISSCC Program, 2002
 Chair, ISSCC Program, 2003
 Chair, ISSCC Technology-Directions Subcommittee, 2004–2009
 Vice-Chair, ISSCC Conference, 2009
 Chair, ISSCC Student Forum Committee (now called the Student Research Preview Committee), 2009
 Chair, ISSCC Conference, 2010–2018
 Senior Technical Advisor, 2018– present

He has been recognized as having the highest number of publications in the history of the conference.

Board affiliations 

Member, Board of The Engine, 2016–2021
Member, SMART Governing Board, 2017–present
Member, Board of Trustees of the Perkins School for the Blind, 2018–2022
Member, Board of Analog Devices, Inc., 2019–present

Personal life 
Chandrakasan currently lives in Belmont, Massachusetts, with his wife and three children, the oldest of whom graduated from MIT in 2017.

Honors and awards 

 1995 IBM Faculty Development Award
1995 NSF Career Development Award
 1996, 1997 National Semiconductor Faculty Development Awards
 1997 IEEE Electron Devices Society’s Paul Rappaport Award
2004 elected fellow of the Institute of Electrical and Electronics Engineers (IEEE)
 2007 ISSCC Beatrice Winner Award for Editorial Excellence
2007/8/9 ISSCC Jack Kilby Award for Outstanding Student Paper 
 2009 Semiconductor Industry Association University Researcher Award
 2013 IEEE Donald O. Pederson Award in Solid-State Circuits
2015 Member of the National Academy of Engineering 
 2016 Honorary doctorate from KU Leuven
 2017 UC Berkeley EE Distinguished Alumni Award
2019 IEEE Solid-State Circuits Society Distinguished Service Award
2019 Member of the American Academy of Arts and Sciences
2020 Association for Computing Machinery Fellow
2022 IEEE Mildred Dresselhaus Medal

References

External links 
 Anantha Chandrakasan, MIT website
 Anantha Chandrakasan's profile, MIT School of Engineering

Living people
IEEE award recipients
Indian computer scientists
Indian electrical engineers
Year of birth missing (living people)
Indian university and college faculty deans
Indian expatriate academics
Indian expatriates in the United States
Scientists from Chennai